The 1934 Copa del Presidente de la República Final was the 34th final of the Copa del Rey, the Spanish football cup competition. Madrid FC beat Valencia FC 2–1 and won their 6th title.

Road to the final

Match details

References
linguasport.com
RSSSF.com

External links
MundoDeportivo.com 
Marca.com 
AS.com 

1934
Copa
Real Madrid CF matches
Valencia CF matches